Marcus Mårtensson (born 23 April 1990) is a Swedish footballer who plays for Stafsinge IF on loan from Falkenbergs FF as a midfielder.

References

External links
 (archive)

1990 births
Living people
Association football midfielders
Swedish footballers
Allsvenskan players
Superettan players
Kalmar FF players
Lindsdals IF players